Different Morals is a 1931 German comedy film directed by Gerhard Lamprecht and starring Walter Rilla, Aribert Wäscher, and Elga Brink. It was shot at the Tempelhof and Staaken Studios in Berlin. The film's sets were designed by the art director Otto Moldenhauer.

Cast

References

Bibliography

External links 
 

1931 films
1931 comedy films
German comedy films
Films of the Weimar Republic
1930s German-language films
Films directed by Gerhard Lamprecht
German films based on plays
Films shot at Staaken Studios
Films shot at Tempelhof Studios
Tobis Film films
National Film films
German black-and-white films
1930s German films